Metzneria brandbergi is a moth of the family Gelechiidae. It was described by Anthonie Johannes Theodorus Janse in 1963. It is found in Namibia.

References

Endemic fauna of Namibia
Moths described in 1963
Metzneria